The 2020–21 Super50 Cup was the 47th edition of the Super50 Cup, the domestic limited-overs cricket competition for the countries of the Cricket West Indies (CWI). The tournament took place in February 2021 in Antigua and Barbuda. Six teams competed in the tournament – Barbados, Guyana, Jamaica, the Leeward Islands, Trinidad and Tobago, and the Windward Islands. The West Indies Emerging Team won the previous edition of the competition.

On 15 June 2020, CWI held a players' draft for the 2020–21 tournament. The draft took place across two rounds, with each team signing a minimum of fifteen players. In December 2020, Cricket West Indies confirmed that the United States, Canada, Combined Campuses and Colleges and the West Indies Emerging Team would not be taking part in the tournament. On 25 January 2021, CWI announced the schedule for the tournament, with all the squads confirmed two days later.

Following the conclusion of the group stage, Guyana, Jamaica, Trinidad and Tobago and the Windward Islands had all qualified for the semi-finals, with Barbados and the Leeward Islands facing each other in the fifth-place play-off match. In the first semi-final, Trinidad and Tobago beat Jamaica by six wickets to advance to the final. The second semi-final saw Guyana beat the Windward Islands by 95 runs to join Trinidad and Tobago in the final. Trinidad and Tobago won the tournament, beating Guyana by 152 runs in the final.

Squads

Ahead of the tournament, Kyle Hope and Shai Hope were initially ruled out of the Barbados team after testing positive for COVID-19. Tevyn Walcott and Zachary McCaskie were named as their replacements. Guayana's Trevon Griffith also tested positive for COVID-19, and was replaced by Kemol Savory. On 18 February 2021, the tournament's Technical Committee announced that Kyle Hope and Shai Hope would replace Dominic Drakes and Keon Harding in the Barbados team, and Kofi James replaced Nino Henry for the Leeward Islands. On the same day, Veerasammy Permaul and Raymon Reifer were both added to Guyana's squad.

Points table

 Advanced to the Semi-finals
 Advanced to the 5th place play-off

Fixtures

Finals

References

External links
 Series home at ESPN Cricinfo

2021 in West Indian cricket
Super50
Regional Super50 seasons